Austin Steven Beck (born November 21, 1998) is an American professional baseball outfielder in the Oakland Athletics organization.

Amateur career
Beck attended North Davidson High School in Welcome, North Carolina. As a junior he hit .465 with five home runs and 30 runs batted in (RBIs). In pre-game warm-ups prior to his team's first playoff game that year, he tore his ACL causing him to miss the remainder of the playoffs. Beck returned from the injury to start his senior year. Beck committed to the University of North Carolina to play college baseball.

Professional career
Beck was considered one of the top prospects for the 2017 Major League Baseball draft. The Oakland Athletics selected him with the sixth overall selection of the draft. The club signed him to a franchise-record $5.303 million contract. After signing, Beck was assigned to the AZL Athletics, where he spent the whole season, posting a .211 batting average with two home runs and 28 RBIs in 41 games.

Beck spent the 2018 season with the Beloit Snappers of the Class A Midwest League, slashing .296/.335/.383 with two home runs and 60 RBIs in 123 games and earning All-Star honors. He spent 2019 with the Stockton Ports of the Class A-Advanced California League. Over 85 games, he batted .251/.302/.411 with eight home runs and 49 RBIs.

References

External links

1998 births
Living people
People from Lexington, North Carolina
People from Davidson County, North Carolina
Baseball players from North Carolina
Baseball outfielders
Arizona League Athletics players
Beloit Snappers players
Stockton Ports players